Glutamine amidotransferase-like class 1 domain-containing protein 3A, mitochondrial is a protein that in humans is encoded by the GATD3A gene.

See also
 Glutamine amidotransferase

References

External links

Further reading